Miloš Blagojević (17 October 1930 – 27 June 2012) was a Serbian historian and member of the Serbian Academy of Science and Arts (SANU). After he completed high school in Vršac he graduated on military academy in Split in 1951. Because of political reasons he was unable to continue with military career so he graduated Belgrade Faculty of Philosophy in 1960.

Main works

References

External links 
 Biography on the website of SANU

1930 births
2012 deaths
People from Plandište
20th-century Serbian historians
Members of the Serbian Academy of Sciences and Arts
University of Belgrade Faculty of Philosophy alumni
Yugoslav historians